Cheonan City FC (Korean: 천안 시티 FC) is a South Korean football club based in Cheonan that competes in the K League 2, the second tier of South Korean football. They play their home games at the 26,000 capacity Cheonan Stadium.

History
Cheonan City FC was founded in 2008 and competed in the Korea National League from 2008 to 2019, and the K3 League from 2020 to 2022.

Before the 2023 season, the team moved to the second-tier K League 2 and became fully professional.

Current squad
As of 1 March 2023

Out on loan and military service

Honours

 K3 League
 Runners-up (1): 2021

 Korea National League Championship
Runners-up (2): 2013, 2017

 Korean National Sports Festival
Gold medal (2): 2010, 2016
Bronze medal (1): 2009

 Korean President's Cup
Runners-up (1): 2009

Season-by-season records

See also
List of football clubs in South Korea

References

External links
Official website 

Korea National League clubs
Sport in South Chungcheong Province
Cheonan
Association football clubs established in 2008
2008 establishments in South Korea
K3 League clubs
K League 2 clubs